The 1923–24 Hong Kong First Division League season was the 16th since its establishment.

Overview
South China won the championship.

References
RSSSF

Hong Kong First Division League
1923 in Hong Kong
1924 in Hong Kong
Hong Kong First Division League seasons
Hong Kong
Hong Kong